Cocktail hour may refer to:
Happy hour
Cocktail Hour (film), 1933 film
The Cocktail Hour, a 1988 play by A. R. Gurney
Cocktail Hour, an album; see List of Jo Stafford compilation albums (2000–09)